Roland Königshofer (born 24 October 1962) is a retired Austrian cyclist. He won a medal at every UCI Motor-paced World Championships between 1985 and 1994, until the championships were discontinued, either in the amateurs (1985–1992) or professionals category (1993–1994). He also competed at the 1988 Summer Olympics in the 4000 m team pursuit and points race and finished in 16th and 12th place, respectively.

His son Lukas (b. 1989) is a football player. His brother Thomas is also a retired cyclists; he finished third at the UCI Motor-paced World Championships in 1989 behind Roland.

References

1962 births
Living people
Austrian male cyclists
Cyclists at the 1988 Summer Olympics
Olympic cyclists of Austria